Anne Muxel is a French sociologist more specialised in the study of the biographical memory. Her major sociological works concern politic socialisation, on one hand, and biographical roots of political and family behaviour, on the other hand. She is Research Director at the French National Center for Scientific Research (CNRS) and a senior research fellow in the Paris Institute of Political Studies, a French research institute specializing in political and economic sciences and, specifically, in political sociology.

Publications

 2010, « Avoir 20 ans en politique », Seuil, 237 p., Paris
 2009, (avec Bruno Cautráes) « Comment Les electeurs Font-ils Leurs Choix : Le Panel electoral Francais 2007 », Seuil, 385 p., Paris,  
 2008, « Toi, Moi Et La Politique: Amour Et Convictions », Seuil, 282 p., Paris,  * 2005, « Les abstentionnistes : le premier parti européen », Pascal Perrineau (dir.), Le vote européen 2004-2005. De l’élargissement au référendum français, Presses de Sciences Po, Paris
 2005, « Les jeunes et les élections européennes : un paradoxe démocratique ? », Delwit Pascal, Poirier Ph., Parlement puissant, électeurs absents ? Les élections européennes de juin 2004, Editions de l’université de Bruxelles, Bruxelles
 2004, Les étudiants de Sciences Po. Leurs idées, leurs valeurs, leurs cultures politiques, Presses de Sciences Po, Paris
 2003, « La poussée des abstentions : protestation, malaise, sanction », Pascal Perrineau, Ysmal Colette (dir.), Le vote de tous les refus. Les élections présidentielles et législatives de 2002, Presses de Sciences Po, Paris
 2003, Les Étudiants de Sciences Po. Leurs idées, leurs valeurs, leurs cultures politiques, Presses de Sciences Po, Paris
 2001, (codirection avec Marlaine Cacouault) Les Jeunes d’Europe du Sud et la politique. Une enquête comparative France, Italie, Espagne, L’Harmattan, 287 p., Paris
 2001, L’Expérience politique des jeunes, Presses de Sciences Po, 190 p., Paris
 1996, Individu et mémoire familiale, Nathan, 226 p., Paris
 1996, Les Jeunes et la politique, Hachette, 134 p., Paris

References

External links
 La mémoire familiale, une sociologie de l'intime
 Identité : leur nom de jeune fille, elles y tiennent

French sociologists
French women sociologists
Living people
Year of birth missing (living people)
Research directors of the French National Centre for Scientific Research